Quantum Electronics is a peer-reviewed scientific journal. It is the English edition of the Russian journal "Kvantovaya Elektronika". The editor-in-chief is Oleg N. Krokhin (Lebedev Physical Institute). The journal covers all topics pertaining to laser research and laser applications. Publishing formats include letters, regular papers, discussions, and reviews.

Continuation
This journal was established in 1971 as the Soviet Journal of Quantum Electronics (ISSN 0049-1748). It also appears to be the English edition of this Russian journal from 1971 to 1992, when the English title changed to Quantum Electronics.

Abstracting and indexing
This journal is abstracted and indexed in:

According to the Journal Citation Reports, the journal has a 2020 impact factor of 1.022.

References

External links
 Turpion publishing

Quantum mechanics journals
Monthly journals
IOP Publishing academic journals
Publications established in 1971
English-language journals
Optics journals